Sungui Station is a metro station on the Suin Line of the Seoul Metropolitan Subway system that opened on February 27, 2016. It is located in Sinheung-dong, Jung-gu, Incheon.

Its site was originally an abandoned railway station known as Namincheon Station back then which opened in 1937 and closed in the 1970s.

References

Metro stations in Incheon
Railway stations opened in 2016
Seoul Metropolitan Subway stations
Jung District, Incheon
2016 establishments in South Korea